Elie Konki (born 6 April 1992) is a French professional boxer. As an amateur, he competed in the men's flyweight event at the 2016 Summer Olympics.

Professional boxing record

References

External links
 

1992 births
Living people
French male boxers
Olympic boxers of France
Boxers at the 2016 Summer Olympics
Place of birth missing (living people)
European Games competitors for France
Boxers at the 2015 European Games
Flyweight boxers
Black French sportspeople
People from Meulan-en-Yvelines
Bantamweight boxers